Wolental  is a village in the administrative district of Gmina Skórcz, within Starogard County, Pomeranian Voivodeship, in northern Poland. It is located within the ethnocultural region of Kociewie in the historic region of Pomerania.

For details of the history of the region, see History of Pomerania.

The village has a population of 560.

Wolental was a royal village of the Polish Crown, administratively located in the Tczew County in the Pomeranian Voivodeship.

During the German occupation of Poland (World War II), several Poles from Wolental were murdered by the Germans in the Zajączek forest nearby in 1939 (see Intelligenzaktion), and 55 Poles were expelled in 1943-1944, and their farms were handed over to German colonists as part of the Lebensraum policy.

References

Wolental